Samuel or Sam Gordon may refer to:

Politics
Samuel Y. Gordon (1861–1940), lieutenant governor of Minnesota
Samuel Gordon (New York politician) (1802–1873), U.S. representative from New York
Samuel Gordon (Australian politician) (1811–1882), Australian merchant, pastoralist and politician
Samuel Gordon (Washington County, NY) of 37th New York State Legislature

Sports
Sam Gordon (baseball) (1878–1962), American baseball player
Samantha Gordon (born 2003), American football running back
Samuel Gordon (footballer), bronze medallist for Burma in Football at the 1954 Asian Games
Sam Gordon (Australian footballer) in 2011 AFL Under 18 Championships

Others
Samuel Dickey Gordon (1859–1936), author and evangelical lay minister
Sam Gordon (musician), see George Baquet
Samuel Gordon (novelist) (1871–1927), English novelist

See also
Samuel Gorton (1593–1677), early Rhode Island settler